Mill Brook is a river in Delaware County and Ulster County in New York. It flows into the Pepacton Reservoir west of Arena.

References

Rivers of New York (state)
Rivers of Delaware County, New York